Paul John Beadle (25 November 1917 – 28 December 1992) was a New Zealand sculptor and medallist.

Early life and training
Born in Hungerford, Berkshire, England in 1917, Beadle studied cabinetmaking and building construction at Cambridge Art School for two years before going on to the London County Council Central School of Arts and Crafts. He also studied privately under sculptor and carver Alfred Southwick. He went on to Copenhagen to study in the studio of Kurt Harald Eisenstein, where his classicist style and leanings began to develop.

World War II
When World War II began, Beadle enlisted in the Royal Navy and served with the Home Fleet, Mediterranean Fleet and the Pacific Fleet until 1943. In 1944 he travelled to Australia as a submariner-artist and stayed there once the war ended working for Australian newspapers and taking up teaching.

Career
In 1950 he became a foundation member of the Society of Sculptors and Associates in Sydney. For six years from 1951, he was the head of the Art School at Newcastle Technical College. He was Principal of the South Australian School of Art 1958–1960 and president of the Royal South Australian Society of Arts 1958–1959.

In 1953–1954 he created the stylised American eagle perched upon a bronze sphere surmounting the octagonal tapered column of the Australian–American Memorial in Canberra.

In 1961 he moved to Auckland to become Professor of Fine Arts at the University of Auckland. Between 1961 and 1975 he was also the Dean of Elam School of Art. He was the foundation president of the New Zealand Society of Sculptors and Associates in Auckland in 1962. He was also a Fellow of the Royal South Australian Society of Arts and the President of the New Zealand Society of Industrial Designers (NZSID).

Beadle's sculptural work drew upon influences from the Hallstatt Culture of the early Iron Age, West African Ashanti bronzes and combined these with references to life in modern New Zealand. According to art historian Mark Stocker, Beadle was "New Zealand's foremost internationally recognised medal maker."

Recognition
Beadle has exhibited with the New Zealand art association The Group and the New Zealand Academy of Fine Arts. His work is included in the collections of the Auckland Art Gallery Toi o Tāmaki, Museum of New Zealand Te Papa Tongarewa, the Australian National Gallery and the state galleries of Sydney, Perth and Adelaide. University of Auckland offers the Paul Beadle Scholarship annually for postgraduate students at Elam School of Art.

References

1917 births
1992 deaths
20th-century Royal Navy personnel
Military personnel from Berkshire
People from Hungerford
Royal Navy personnel of World War II
British expatriates in Australia
British emigrants to New Zealand
People from Auckland
Art educators
Academic staff of the University of Auckland
20th-century New Zealand sculptors
20th-century New Zealand male artists
New Zealand industrial designers